The Sombor Monastery is a Serb Orthodox monastery situated in the Bačka region, in the northern Serbian province of Vojvodina. It is in the Sombor municipality. It was founded in 1928–1933.

See also
List of Serb Orthodox monasteries

References

Serbian Orthodox monasteries in Vojvodina
Bačka
Sombor
20th-century Christian monasteries
20th-century establishments in Serbia